Scopula gastonaria is a moth of the family Geometridae. It was described by Oberthür in 1876. It is endemic to Algeria.

Subspecies
Scopula gastonaria gastonaria (Algeria)
Scopula gastonaria luteofasciata (Rothschild, 1913) (southern Algeria)

References

Moths described in 1876
gastonaria
Endemic fauna of Algeria
Taxa named by Charles Oberthür
Moths of Africa